Marconi is a station of the Brescia Metro, in the city of Brescia in northern Italy.

This ultra-modern station was built under the western end of Parco Marconi. The above ground structure brings a touch of the future into a twentieth-century park and skylight pyramids protrude from the lawn.

References

External links

Brescia Metro stations
Railway stations opened in 2013
2013 establishments in Italy
Railway stations in Italy opened in the 21st century